Hucín  is a village and municipality in Revúca District in the Banská Bystrica Region of Slovakia.

History
In historical records, the village was first mentioned in 1327 (1327 Gyuche, 1418 Gyche, 1565 Hwczyn, 1566 Huczin Dorf, 1580 Hwsin). It belonged to local feudatories Gizey. Some Germans established here in the 16th century. From 1938 to 1945 it was annexed by Hungary.

Genealogical resources

The records for genealogical research are available at the state archive "Statny Archiv in Kosice, Slovakia"

 Roman Catholic church records (births/marriages/deaths): 1779-1899 (parish B)
 Lutheran church records (births/marriages/deaths): 1784-1897 (parish B)
 Reformated church records (births/marriages/deaths): 1757-1900 (parish A)

See also
 List of municipalities and towns in Slovakia

External links
https://web.archive.org/web/20070513023228/http://www.statistics.sk/mosmis/eng/run.html
Surnames of living people in Hucin

Villages and municipalities in Revúca District